Sir Maurice Ralph Kay  PC (born 6 December 1942) is a retired member of the Court of Appeal of England and Wales.

Kay was educated at William Hulme's Grammar School in Manchester and the University of Sheffield

Kay was called to the Bar in 1975 (Gray's Inn) and was elected a bencher in 1995. He became a Queen's Counsel and was appointed a Recorder in 1988. He was appointed to the High Court on 17 January 1995, receiving the customary knighthood. He was assigned to the Queen's Bench Division, serving on the Employment Appeal Tribunal from June 1995. He was Presiding Judge of the Chester Circuit from 1996 to 1999, and was appointed Judge in Charge of the Administrative Court in 2002. On 14 January 2004, Kay became a Lord Justice of Appeal, and was appointed to the Privy Council on 11 February of that year. He served as President of the Judicial Studies Board from July 2007 to July 2010, and began a three-year term as Vice-President of the Court of Appeal (Civil Division) on 6 May 2010.

Kay is an honorary fellow of Robinson College, Cambridge.

See also
 List of Lords Justices of Appeal

References

1942 births
English King's Counsel
Living people
Members of the Privy Council of the United Kingdom
Knights Bachelor
Fellows of Robinson College, Cambridge